Conan the Barbarian is a character created by Robert E. Howard.

Conan the Barbarian may also refer to:
Conan the Barbarian fictional universe, see Hyborian Age
Conan the Barbarian (1955 collection), a 1955 collection of stories about the character published by Gnome Press
Conan the Barbarian (comics), 1970s Marvel comic series
Conan the Barbarian (1982 film), a film starring Arnold Schwarzenegger
Conan the Barbarian (1982 novel), a novelization of the 1982 film
Conan the Barbarian (2011 film), a film starring Jason Momoa
Conan the Barbarian (2011 novel), a novelization of the 2011 film
Conan the Barbarian (2011 collection), a collection of stories about the character published by Ballantine Books
Conan (Dark Horse Comics), an ongoing comics series from Dark Horse Comics by Brian Wood

See also
 Conan (disambiguation)
 Conan the Adventurer (disambiguation)
 Conan the Cimmerian (disambiguation)
 Conan the Conqueror (disambiguation)
 Conan the Destroyer (disambiguation)
 Barbarian (disambiguation)